2014 North American winter storm can refer to
January 2-4, 2014 North American blizzard
January 20-22, 2014 North American blizzard
January 2014 Gulf Coast winter storm
February 2014 nor'easter
March 2014 North American winter storm
March 2014 nor'easter
November 13-21, 2014 North American winter storm
December 2014 North American storm complex